Herbert Berg may refer to:

Herbert Berg (bobsleigh), West German bobsledder who competed in the late 1970s
Herbert Berg (scholar), religious studies professor at the University of North Carolina Wilmington
Herbert Berg (racing driver), German racing driver who participated in the 1938 Grand Prix season